The 2007 Arab Futsal Championship was the 3rd Championship and it took place in Tripoli, Libya from January 10 to January 20, 2007.

Group stage

Matches

Honors

Best Player: Morad Bokare - 
Best Goalkeeper: Mohammed Al-Sharif - 
Top Goal Scorer: Abdul-Wahed Mohammed (8) -  & Hithem Atwe (8) - 
Fair-Play Team:

Sources
Futsal Planet
RSSF

2007
2007
2007 in futsal
2007 in Asian futsal
2007 in African football
Futsal